The 1970 Peru–Ecuador earthquake occurred on December 9 at . The epicenter was located in northwestern Peru, between Piura and Tumbes, near the Peru–Ecuador border. This earthquake had a magnitude of  7.1, or  7.1. About 81 people were reported dead in Peru and in Ecuador together. Liquefaction was observed. The maximum Mercalli Intensity reached IX (Violent). Fractures in constructions were reported in the urban area of Talara. This was a shallow earthquake, and it was thought to occur in the plate above the plate boundary.

See also
List of earthquakes in 1970
List of earthquakes in Ecuador
List of earthquakes in Peru

References

External links

1970 earthquakes
1970 in Peru
1970 in Ecuador
Earthquakes in Peru
Earthquakes in Ecuador
December 1970 events in South America
1970 disasters in Peru 
1970 disasters in Ecuador